Ramey is an unincorporated community in Morrill Township, Morrison County, Minnesota, United States.  The community is located along 345th Avenue near its junction with Morrison County Road 26, Nature Road.  Nearby places include Pierz, Hillman, and Foley.

References

Unincorporated communities in Morrison County, Minnesota
Unincorporated communities in Minnesota